Let Me Come Home is the third album by Doghouse Records recording artist Limbeck. It was released in 2005.

Track listing
 "People Don't Change" - 3:18	
 "Long Way to Go" - 2:52
 "Everyone's In the Parking Lot" - 3:18
 "Making the Rounds" - 2:43
 "Sin City" - 4:10
 "Usually Deluded" - 3:36
 "Names for Dogs" - 2:05
 "Watchin' the Moon Rise Over Town" - 2:19
 "Home (Is Where the Van Is)" - 2:19
 "Television" - 3:13
 " To Hell with Having Fun" - 3:16
 "I Saw You Laughing" - 3:42
 "'91 Honda" - 2:42

Personnel
 Robb MacLean - guitars, lead vocals, percussion, wind chimes, photography
 Patrick Carrie - guitars, backing vocals, electric sitar, harmonica, glockenspiel, gong, percussion
 Justin Entsminger - bass
 Matt Stephens - drums, percussion

Additional artists
 Limbeck: Composer
 Ed Ackerson: Audio Production, Composer, Engineer, Farfisa Organ, Fender Rhodes, Mixing, Organ (Hammond), Percussion, Piano, Producer, Vocals, Wurlitzer
 Rachael Cantu: Vocals
 Jeff Lipton: Mastering
 Gary Louris: Accordion, Audio Production, Composer, Fender Rhodes, Glockenspiel, Percussion, Piano, Producer, Slide Guitar, Synthesizer, Vocals
 Justin Pierre: Vocals
 Nick Pritchard: Design, Layout Design
 Bryan Sheffield: Photography

References

2007 albums
Doghouse Records albums